Leonurus quinquelobatus is a herbaceous flowering plant native to Eurasia, where it is found from Sakhalin, Russia west to Italy and central Europe.

References 

Lamiaceae